This is a list of schools in Albania.

Schools in Tiranë

 Abdulla Keta High School
 Aleks Buda High School  
 Andon Zako Çajupi High School
 Arben Broci High School
Asim Vokshi High School
 Ahmet Gashi High School
 Besnik Sykja High School 
Eqrem Çabej High School
 Gjergji Canco Technologic High School 
 Hoteleri-Turizëm High School 
Ismail Qemali High School  
 Jordan Misja High School 
 Karl Gega High School 
 Koreografike High School 
 Loro Boriçi High School 
 Myslym Keta High School 
 Partizani  High School 
Petro Nini Luarasi High School 
Qemal Stafa High School    
Sami Frashëri High School 
 Sandër Prosi High School
 Sinan Tafaj High School
 Teknike-Ekonomike High School
 Kostandin Kristoforidhi High School
 Harry T. Fultz Institution

Schools in Kavajë

Elementary Level
 Golem
 Kryemdhej
 Seferaj
 Qerret
 Kanaparaj
 Agonas
 Karpen
 Bregu i Përroit
 Helmës
 Kryezi
 Memzotaj
 Cikallesh
 Çetë
 Momël
 Shtodhër
 Qamil Xhani
 28 Nëntori
 Beden
 Blerimaj
 11 Shkurti
 Razi Leka
 Rrikaj
 Dëshmorët e Shkodrës
 Sadi Tatani
 Mehmet Babamusta
 3 Dëshmorët
 Rilindja
 Instituti i Minorenëve 
 Fiqiri Kurti
 Dituria
 Visare

Higher Level
 Aleksandër Moisiu
 Luz i Vogël
 Synej
 26 Marsi
 Charles Telford Ericson
 Hafiz Ali Korça
 Dituria
 Kërkuesit e Dijes

Schools in Durrës 
Gjergj Kastrioti High School
Naim Frasheri High School
Leonik Tomeu High School
Dom Nikoll Kaçorri High School 
Olsi Lasko High School
Benardina Qerraxhia Sports Mastery 
Hysen Çela Technological High School 
Beqir Çela Professional High School

Private Schools
 ARBERIA High School
 ARISTOTELI High School
 ARSAKEIO High School
 CELESI MAGJIK High School
 DON BOSKO High School
 DRITA E DITURISE High School
 EKONOMISTI High School
 ERNEST KOLIQI High School
 EUROLINGUA High School
 EUROVIZION High School
 FAIK KONICA High School
 FLABINA High School 
 GAUSS High School 
 LINZ High School
 GUINESS High School
 HARRY FULTZ High School
 KRISTAQ RAMA High School
 M.AKIF.DJEM High School
 M.AKIF.VAJZA High School
 MARIA High School
 MEDRESE MAHMUD DASHI High School
 MERIDIAN+ High School
 MESONJTORJA High School
 MIST High School
 MREKULLIA High School
 NILS BOR High School
 NJUTON High School
 NOBEL High School
 QELLIMI I JETES High School
 RREZE DRITE High School
 SAADI High School
 TIRANA JONE High School
 TURGUT ÖZAL College
 UNITED ALBANIAN COLLEGE
 UNIVERS High School
 VELLEZERIT KAJTAZI High School
 Wilson High School (Tirana)
 WISDOM High School

Private Schools
Vinçens Prendushi Primary & High School
Frymë Dashurie Primary & High School
Mihal Ekonomi Primary & High School
Iliria Primary & High School
Kasa Primary & High School
Konica Primary & High School
Migjeni Primary & High School
Pavaresia Primary & High School
Rilindja High School
Turgut Özal College
Top School
Albanian College Durres

Schools in Shkodër
28 Nëntori High School
Scutari High School
Jordan Misja High School
Pjeter Meshkalla High School
Hasan Riza Pasha College
Shkolla Austriake "Peter Mahringer"

Schools in Korçë
Faik Konica Linguistic High School
Preca College
Isuf Gjata Professional High School
Irakli Terova Professional High School
Fan S. Noli Professional High School
Tefta Tashko Koco Artistic high School
Demir Progri Professional High School

Schools in Elbasan
 KOSTANDIN KRISTOFORIDHI High School
 SAMI FRASHËRI High School
 KOSTANDIN SHPATARAKU High School
 MIRANDA BAKU High School
 TOMORR SINANI High School
 DASKAL TODRI High School
 VASIL KAMAMI High School
 MAHIR DOMI High School
 ANASTAS ÇAKALLI High School
 AHMET DAKLI High School
LUIGJ GURAKUQI High School
QAMIL GURANJAKU Primary School

Private Schools
 LIRIA High School
 NIKOLLA KOPERNIKU High School
 INKUS High School

Schools in Lezhë
 HYDAJET LEZHA High School

Private Schools
 ROGACIONISTËT High School
 EFFATA School
 AT SHTJEFEN GJEÇOV School
 Lezha Academic Center

Schools in Vlora
Ali Demi High School

Schools in Gjirokastër
Gjirokastër Gymnasium

See also

Education in Albania
List of universities in Albania
List of libraries in Albania

 
Albania
Albania
Schools
Schools
Schools